Widdoes is a surname. Notable people with the surname include:

 Carroll Widdoes (20th century), American football coach and athletics administrator
 James Widdoes (born 1953), American actor and director
 Kathleen Widdoes (born 1939), American actress

See also
 Widdows
 Widows